Thomas Charles "Tom" Petrone (July 21, 1937 – August 5, 2014) was a Democratic member of the Pennsylvania House of Representatives for the 27th District and was elected in 1980. He died in 2014.

References

External links
Pennsylvania House of Representatives - Tom Petrone official PA House website
Pennsylvania House Democratic Caucus - Representative Tom Petrone official Party website
Biography, voting record, and interest group ratings at Project Vote Smart
Follow the Money - Tom Petrone
2006 2004 2002 2000 1998 campaign contributions

1937 births
2014 deaths
Democratic Party members of the Pennsylvania House of Representatives
Politicians from Pittsburgh